Warzęgowo  (de:Wersingawe, Hohenau) is a village in the administrative district of Gmina Wołów, within Wołów County, Lower Silesian Voivodeship, in south-western Poland. Prior to 1945 it was in Germany.
In near forest lie rubbles of lignite mine.

References

Villages in Wołów County